Vadim Menkov (born 12 February 1987) is an Uzbek male sprint canoeist who has competed since the late 2000s. He has won six medals at the ICF Canoe Sprint World Championships with two golds (C-1 1000 m: 2009, 2010), a silver (C-1 500 m: 2013) and two bronze (C-1 500 m: 2010, C-1 1000 m: 2011). Most recently, Menkov won the gold medal in the sprint C1-1000m event in canoeing at the 2010 Asian Games in Guangzhou, China.

Menkov also competed at the 2008 Summer Olympics in Beijing, finishing fourth in the C-1 1000 m event while being eliminated in the semi-finals of the C-1 500m.  At the 2012 Summer Olympics he competed in the C-1 200 m, finishing 10th, and the C-1 1000 m, finishing 4th again.

Biography 
Menkov was born in Toytepa, Tashkent Region, Uzbekistan. In 2004 he entered to the "Olympic reserver" high-school in Chirchiq. After graduation he was able to enter to the "Uzbek State Institute of Physical Culture" in 2007.

Career 
Menkov began his career in 2003 under coach Aleksandr Panomaryov.

In 2006 in Doha, he won his first International tournament. That same year he won the Asian Championship in canoeing, and went on to take the second place in the Canoe World Championship, which was held in Poland.

He competed in the 2008 Summer Olympics in Beijing, where he achieved the 4th place in the C-1 1000 meter event. 

In 2009, Menkov won number of International tournaments which were held in Poland, Czech Republic and Hungary. Due to his results he was recognized as the 2009 Canoe Athlete of the Year by the International Canoe Federation.

In 2012 he represented Uzbekistan at the 2012 Summer Olympics in London. He finished 4th with a time of 3:49.255.

At the 2014 Asian Games he won the gold medal in the men's C-1 1000 m event.

Menkov is one of the most recognized sportsmen in Uzbekistan, holding the title of "Honoured Master of Sport in Uzbekistan" since 2014.

References

External links 
 Profile  at Canoe09.ca

1987 births
Living people
Uzbekistani male canoeists
Olympic canoeists of Uzbekistan
Canoeists at the 2008 Summer Olympics
Canoeists at the 2012 Summer Olympics
Asian Games medalists in canoeing
Canoeists at the 2006 Asian Games
Canoeists at the 2010 Asian Games
Canoeists at the 2014 Asian Games
Canoeists at the 2018 Asian Games
ICF Canoe Sprint World Championships medalists in Canadian
People from Tashkent Region
Asian Games gold medalists for Uzbekistan
Asian Games bronze medalists for Uzbekistan
Medalists at the 2006 Asian Games
Medalists at the 2010 Asian Games
Medalists at the 2014 Asian Games
Medalists at the 2018 Asian Games
21st-century Uzbekistani people